The Military Surplus Act (or Kahn-Wadsworth Act) was signed into US law by the 66th US Congress in 1920. Sponsored by Representative Julius Kahn (R) of California and Senator James Wolcott Wadsworth, Jr. (R) of New York, it distributed 25,000 surplus army trucks to state highway departments for road-building purposes.

References

1920 in American law
United States federal legislation